Ardonissa is a genus of moths in the subfamily Arctiinae. It was described by Paul Dognin in 1907, and its single species is Ardonissa adscitina, which is found in Peru.

References

External links
Natural History Museum Lepidoptera generic names catalog

Lithosiini
Monotypic moth genera
Moths of South America